Jordi Cortadella Fortuny is a Spanish computer scientist specializing in electronic design automation. He is a professor of computer science at the Polytechnic University of Catalonia.

Cortadella was elected to the Academia Europaea in 2013. He was named as a Fellow of the Institute of Electrical and Electronics Engineers (IEEE) in 2015 for contributions to the design of asynchronous and elastic circuits.

References

External links
Home page

Spanish computer scientists
Academic staff of the Polytechnic University of Catalonia
Fellow Members of the IEEE
Members of Academia Europaea
Living people
Year of birth missing (living people)